Acta Applicandae Mathematicae is a peer-reviewed mathematics journal published by Springer. Founded in 1983, the journal publishes articles on applied mathematics.

The journal is indexed by Mathematical Reviews and Zentralblatt MATH.
According to the Journal Citation Reports, the journal has a 2020 impact factor of 1.215. According to SCImago Journal Rank (SJR), the journal h-index is 45, ranking it to Q2 in Applied Mathematics.

References

External links

Mathematics journals
Publications established in 1983
English-language journals
Springer Science+Business Media academic journals
Triannual journals